These 155 genera belong to Brachyceridae, a family of snout and bark beetles in the order Coleoptera. There are at least 120 described species in Brachyceridae.

Brachyceridae genera

 Absoloniella Formanek, 1913 c g
 Acentroides  c g
 Afghanocryptus Voss, 1961 c g
 Afroryzophilus Lyal, 1990 c g
 Aganeuma Broun, 1893 c g
 Alaocephala Ganglbauer, 1906 c g
 Alaocyba Perris, 1869 c g
 Alaocybites Gilbert, 1956 i c g b
 Alhypera  c g
 Anchonoides  c g
 Aonychus Schönherr, 1844 c g
 Aoratolcus Kuschel, 1952 c g
 Apachiscelus  c g
 Aplopus  c g
 Aralkumia Baitenov, 1974 c g
 Araxus Marshall, 1955 c g
 Argentinorhynchus Brèthes, 1910 c g
 Arthrostenus Schonherr, 1826 c g
 Athor Broun, 1909 c g
 Baeosomus Broun, 1904 c g
 Bagoidellus Hustache, 1929 c g
 Bagoidus Kuschel, 1956 c g
 Bagoopsis Faust, 1881 c g
 Bordoniola Osella, 1987 c g
 Brachybamus Germar, 1835 i c g b
 Brachycerus Olivier, 1789 i c g
 Brachypus  c g
 Brotheus Stephens, 1829 c g
 Bryocatus Broun, 1915 c g
 Byrsops Germar, 1829 c g
 Caenosilapillus Chûjô & Morimoto, 1959 c g
 Callodus Hustache, 1932 c g
 Coiffaitiella Osella, 1971 g
 Colabotelus Broun, 1914 c g
 Colchis  c g
 Colobotelus  c g
 Creterhirhinus Legalov, 2010 g
 Cretulio Zherichin, 1993 c g
 Cryptops  c g
 Ctylindra Pascoe, 1885 c g
 Cyrtobagous Hustache, 1929 i c g b
 Daulaxius  c g
 Daylesfordia  c g
 Degorsia  c g
 Derosasius  c
 Desmidophorinus Hubenthal, 1917 c g
 Desmidophorus Schönherr, 1837 c g
 Drongis Fairmaire, 1901 c g
 Dyerocera  c g
 Echinocnemus Schoenherr, 1843 c g
 Endaliscus Kirsch, 1873 c g
 Endalus  c g
 Erirhigous Fairmaire, 1898 c g
 Erirhinus  c g
 Erirrhinites Britton, 1960 g
 Erycus  c g
 Euprocas Broun, 1893 c g
 Euretus Péringuey, 1896 c g
 Euryxena Pascoe, 1887 c g
 Ferreria Alonso-Zarazaga & Lyal, 1999 c g
 Gilbertiola Osella, 1982 i g b
 Glaridorrhinus  c g
 Grasidius Champion, 1902 c g
 Grypidius  c g
 Grypus Germar, 1817 i c g b
 Helodytes Kuschel, 1952 c g
 Hexeria Pascoe, 1885 c g
 Himasthlophallus Zherikhin & Egorov, 1990 c g
 Homeostenodema Hustache, 1929 c g
 Homosomus Richard, 1956 c g
 Hoplitotrachelus Schönherr, 1847 c g
 Hydronomidius Faust, 1898 c g
 Hydrotimetes Kolbe, 1911 c g
 Hypoglyptus Gerstacker, 1855 c g
 Hypselus Schönherr, 1843 c g
 Icaris Tournier, 1874 c g
 Ilyodytes Kuschel, 1951 c g
 Ixodicus  c g
 Jekelia Tournier, 1874 c g
 Kandaphila Hustache, 1933 c g
 Lepidonotaris  c
 Liasotus  c g
 Lissorhoptrus LeConte, 1876 i c g b  (rice water weevils)
 Lostianus Desbrochers, 1900 c g
 Monius  c g
 Myrtonymus Kuschel, 1990 g
 Nannilipus  c g
 Neiphagus  c g
 Nemopteryx  c g
 Neobagoidus O'Brien, 1990 b
 Neobagous Hustache, 1926 c g b
 Neochetina Hustache, 1926 i c g b  (waterhyacinth weevils)
 Neogeobyrsa  c g
 Neohydronomus Hustache, 1926 c g b
 Neoicaris  c g
 Neonotaris Hustache, 1936 c g
 Neoubychia Gilbert & Howden, 1987 c g
 Niphobolus Blackburn, 1893 c g
 Notaris Germar, 1817 i c g b
 Notiodes Schönherr, 1838 i c g b
 Notiophilus Duméril, 1805 i c g
 Notodermus  c g
 Numitor Scudder, 1893 c g
 Ochetina Pascoe, 1881 c g
 Ochodontus Desbrochers, 1897 c g
 Ocladius Schoenherr, 1825 c g
 Onychylis LeConte, 1876 i c g b
 Oryzophagus Kuschel, 1951 c g
 Palmatodes  c g
 Pantoteloides  c g
 Paocryptorrhinus Voss, 1965 c g
 Paramonius  c g
 Pararaymondionymus  c g
 Penestes Schönherr, 1825 c g
 Philacta Broun, 1880 c g
 Picia Tournier, 1895 c g
 Picianus Zumpt, 1929 c g
 Prionochelus  c g
 Procas Stephens, 1831 i c g b
 Progradivus Haaf, 1957 c g
 Prolobodontus  c g
 Protomantis Schoenherr, 1840 c g
 Pseudypera  c g
 Pyraechmes  c g
 Raymondia  c g
 Raymondiellus Ganglbauer, 1906 c g
 Raymondionymus Wollaston, 1873 c g
 Remaudierella Hoffmann, 1954 c g
 Schizomicrus Casey, 1905 i c g b
 Siraton Hustache, 1934 c g
 Sitanus Cristofori & Jan, 1832 c g
 Stenopelmus Schönherr, 1835 i c g b
 Stilbopsis Broun, 1893 c g
 Synthocus Schönherr, 1842 c g
 Syrdariella Ter-Minassian, 1978 c g
 Tadius Pascoe, 1885 c g
 Tanysphyrus Germar, 1817 i c g b
 Tarattostichus Ganglbauer, 1906 c g
 Tetracyphus Chevrolat, 1881 c g
 Theanellus Reitter, 1913 c g
 Theates Fåhraeus, 1871 c g
 Theatomorphus Haaf, 1958 c g
 Thecorrhinus  c g
 Thryogenes Bedel, 1884 c g
 Thryogenosoma Voss, 1953 g
 Tournotaris Alonso-Zarazaga & Lyal, 1999 c g b
 Trichocaulus Fairmaire, 1877 c g
 Trichosomus  c g
 Tsherepanovia Korotyaev, 1991 c g
 Turanocryptus Korotyaev, 1987 c g
 Turonerirhinus Legalov, 2014 g
 Tychiops Kuschel, 1955 c g
 Tyrodomus Voss, 1971 c g
 Ubychia Rost, 1881 c g
 Xeronoma Iablokoff-Khnzorian, 1964 c g

Data sources: i = ITIS, c = Catalogue of Life, g = GBIF, b = Bugguide.net

References